Bee Run is a stream located entirely within Miami County, Ohio. It is a tributary of Spring Creek.

Bee Run was named for the frequent honeybees along its course.

See also
List of rivers of Ohio

References

Rivers of Miami County, Ohio
Rivers of Ohio